The capture of the North Frisian Islands and Rømø in July 1864 was the last military operation of the Second Schleswig War between Denmark on the one hand and Prussia and the Austrian Empire on the other hand around the duchies of Schleswig and Holstein, which belonged to Denmark. It ended with the occupation of the North Frisian Islands and Rømø by Austrian troops.

Background
After Prussia and Austria had already largely brought the duchies of Schleswig and Holstein under their control as a result of the Prussian Battle of Dybbøl, an armistice came into force on May 12, 1864. After the failure of peace negotiations at the London Conference of 1864, Prussia and Austria agreed in their June 1864 Carlsbad Agreement to resume the war. With the end of the truce, the conquest of the remaining parts of the duchies began, including the Wadden Sea Islands on the west coast of Schleswig. However, Amrum, southern Rømø, northern Sylt and western Föhr did not belong to the Duchy of Schleswig, but were part of Denmark. Rømø was overwhelmingly Danish while Sylt, Föhr and Amrum were overwhelmingly home to North Frisians, the latter islands having both pro-German and pro-Danish settlements.

On the Danish side, Lieutenant Captain Otto Christian Hammer, having rejoined the Danish Navy after serving as customs, lighthouse and sea mark inspector on the river Eider, was commissioned with defending the North Frisian Islands. He had previously held the same civilian position on Föhr which became his base of operations. In order to suppress a pro-German uprising, Hammer resorted to draconian measures. He also took action against unrest on Sylt. To finance his operations, he had all customs, tax and post offices confiscated. On March 3, he arrested four suspected pro-German collaborators, including Andreas Andersen, in Keitum on Sylt. On June 13, he surrounded Keitum and arrested eight rebels. Among them was the local poet Christian Peter Hansen, who described Hammer's behavior as a "tyrannical regiment" and described him as a "Viking tyrannizing over land and people" and who disseminated his personal views in his later writings. In contrast, the pro-Danish community on the islands presented Hammer with a sword of honour after the war.

The west coast of Schleswig-Holstein fell into Austria's area of ​​operations and Rear Admiral Bernhard von Wüllerstorf-Urbair decided to conquer the islands. He was supported by Prussian units. Due to bad weather, the Austro-Prussian flotilla left Cuxhaven for the theater of operations two days later than planned on July 11.

Occupation of the Islands

The forces of both sides 

The Danish fleet consisted of:
 The paddle steamer Lymfjord
 The screw steamer Augusta
 8 gun dinghies each with 17 men and one cannon
 12 revenue cutters
 10 other coasters

The Austro-Prussian fleet consisted of:
 The ironclad SMS Juan d'Austria (Austria)
 The Ship of the Line Kaiser (Austria)
 The steamer SMS Kaiserin Elizabeth (1854)|Elisabeth (Austria)
 The gunboat SMS Basilisk (Prussia)
 The gunboat SMS Blitz (Prussia)
 The gunboat SMS Seehund|Seal (Austria)
 The gunboat SMS Wall|Wall (Austria)

Because in parts of the North Friesian and Danish Wadden Sea only ships with a shallow draft could be deployed, the Dickschiffe were mostly only indirectly involved in the operation. The four gunboats were under the command of the Austrian Fregattenkapitäns Karl Kronowetter. Added to this were the 5th and. 6th Company of the K.u.k. Field Police Battalion No. 9 from Styria under the command of Lieutenant Colonel Franz von Schidlach.

Oland and Sylt 
On July 6, Oland was taken by General Staff Captain Wiesner with nine fighters. The small force had waded across from the mainland. Since the island had no military value, they withdrew after two hours. The attempted landing on Sylt on July 12 by Feldjäger with Ruderkanonenjollen was thwarted by the shelling of the Danish and perhaps also the Austrian gunboats. Because the Austrian navy had not been informed that the Austrian army should intervene. Andreas Andersen then offered three Austrian army officers to take them from Højer Sogn to the Austrian fleet command off List. The men walked from Jerpstedt through the dried-up mud flats and were within a third of a mile of the shipping fleet when the tide came in. In mortal danger, she took the gunboat "Seal" on board at the last minute. There the men transmitted an order from the ministry in Vienna that the Austrian land army should help with the liberation of Sylt and Föhr. So the military police tried their luck again on July 13. When they came under fire again, they simply pulled the small rowboats onto a sandbank and waited for the tide to go out, which forced the gunboats to retreat. In the end, 200 Austrian military police managed to get to the island. The 5th company crossed from Højer to Keitum and the 6th company from Klanxbüll to Morsum; they were welcomed as liberators by the pro-German population. In front of Keitum they had erected a gate of honor with the inscription: "German brothers, you are welcome!". In Morsum, the soldiers were entertained and the four commanders were made honorary citizens.

Rømø, Föhr and Amrum and blockade of the Wadden Sea Islands 
On July 14, the island Rømø was occupied by Captain Wendt from Ballum. On July 16 they occupied List and crossed over to Föhr and Amrum with two gunboats.

On July 17, the Allies blocked the access routes from the North Frisian Wadden Sea to the North Sea by two Austrian units under Rear Admiral Bernhard von Wüllerstorf-Urbair and Vice Admiral Wilhelm von Tegetthoff.

Foehr, Langeneß and Gröde 
At 6 a.m. on July 18, the Danish flotilla began being shelled in the port of Wyk auf Föhr and the occupation of Langeness and Gröde.

Three hours earlier, however, the Prussian Lieutenant Colonel Gustav von Stiehle and the Danish Colonel Heinrich von Kauffmann (Chief of the General Staff) in Christiansfeld had signed the armistice between Prussia, Austria and Denmark signed.

Surrender of the Danish defenders 
When the Allies learned that the armistice would not come into force until July 20, hostilities resumed on July 19. As a result, on July 19, seven officers, two civil servants and 185 men from the Danish flotilla surrendered to the Allied forces in view of the hopeless situation. Hammer had used the night to set off in the Wadden Sea with his gunboat Liimfoerd. He was only caught in the evening by the Prussian gunboat Blitz, then lowered the flag and handed over his sword with his first officer at 7:30 p.m., a few hours before the armistice came into force. This was forwarded to Prince Adalbert by the commander of the Blitz, lieutenant Archibald MacLean.

Consequences 
The captured Danish ships were first brought to Cuxhaven and remained in Prussian possession. From July 20 to 22, Hammer was initially released to his family in Wyk. When he went out in the village, he was protected by Austrian hunters from attacks by the population. Then he was transported via Husum, Rendsburg to Altona to be imprisoned.

Due to the outcome of the war and the resulting Peace of Vienna, the islands initially became part of the Austrian-Prussian Condominium in Schleswig-Holstein. The Austrian troops stayed on the islands for another three months. Therefore, on August 18, 1864, the 34th birthday of Emperor Franz Josef as co-regent was celebrated on Föhr. The Wyker Fleckenkollegium sent him a telegram of congratulations on this occasion.

References

Further reading 
 Frank Jung: Der Krieg um Schleswig-Holstein. Ellert & Richter Verlag for Schleswig-Holsteinischer Zeitungsverlag, Hamburg 2014, 
 Oliver Bruhns: "Schleswiger Stadtgeschichten." In: Reimer Witt, Oliver Bruhns: "1200 Years Schleswig." Ed. Lions-Club Schleswig, 2006.
 Otto Christian Hammer: "Vesterhavsøernes Forsvar i Aaret 1864", Gyldendal, Copenhagen 1865

External links 

 Two graves in Wyk

North Frisian Islands, capture
Conflicts in 1864
North Frisian Islands
Battles involving Denmark
Battles involving Austria
Battles involving Prussia